Bob Berry may refer to:

 Bob Berry (American football) (born 1942), former National Football League quarterback
 Bob Berry (businessman), CEO Tri-B nursery
 Bob Berry (coach) (1905–1953), American football and track and field coach, college athletics administrator
 Bob Berry (cricketer) (1926–2006), English Test cricketer
 Bob Berry (dendrologist) (1916–2018), New Zealand farmer and creator of Hackfalls Arboretum in Tiniroto, Gisborne
 Bob Berry (ice hockey) (born 1943), coach and player for the NHL

See also
 Robert Berry (disambiguation)